North Western Railway is the name of:
North Western Railway zone, India
"Little" North Western Railway (NWR), a British railway company from 1848 to 1879
North Western Railway (fictional), the railway company featured in The Railway Series and Thomas the Tank Engine & Friends
North Western State Railway -  upon division of British India in year 1947 the major portion of it became Pakistan Railways and remaining  portion in India became Eastern Punjab Railway.

North Western Railway may also refer to:
Austrian Northwestern Railway, former railway company during the Austro-Hungarian monarchy
Chicago & North Western Railway, a previous name of the Chicago & North Western Transportation Company, an American railway company from 1859 to 1995
First North Western, former British passenger train company; originally known as North Western Trains
London & North Western Railway, a British railway company from 1846 to 1922; ancestor of today's West Coast Main Line
North Western Railroad, a short-lived Pennsylvania short-line railroad in the 1850s